Francisco de Paula Martínez y Sáez (March 30, 1835 – 1908) was a Spanish zoologist.

External links
Entomologia: Biography of Francisco de Paula Martínez 

Spanish zoologists
Spanish entomologists
1835 births
1908 deaths